Ten Oaks, also known as the Peyton Rowan House, is a historic mansion in Jacksonville, Alabama, U.S..

History
The house was built in 1856 for  James Madison Crook. It was designed in the Italianate architectural style. In October 1864, in the midst of the American Civil War, Confederate general P. G. T. Beauregard visited the house. A historical marker about the visit was added outside the house in 1970.

In 1865, the house was purchased by Major Peyton Rowan, who lived there with his wife, the former Miss Forney, and their four children, John Forney, Sallie Lorene, Mary Emma and George Hoke. Rowan was a merchant and Mason; the family lived in the house until 1906. It was later inherited by their granddaughter Anne and her husband, T. Weller Smith.

The house has been listed on the National Register of Historic Places since November 29, 2001.

References

Houses on the National Register of Historic Places in Alabama
Italianate architecture in Alabama
Houses completed in 1856
Buildings and structures in Calhoun County, Alabama